Red Eagles Hokkaido (レッドイーグルス北海道) are a professional ice hockey team based in Tomakomai city on Hokkaidō, Japan. They are members of the Asia League Ice Hockey.

History
The club was founded as the Oji Eagles in 1925. They have won the Japan League 13 times, the All Japan Championship 37 times and the Asia League 2 times. Oji became a founding member of Asia League Ice Hockey in 2003. In 2021 the team changed its name to Red Eagles Hokkaido.

Honours

Asia League:
Winners (2): 2007–08, 2011–12
Japan League:
Winners (13): 1968–69, 1969–70, 1973–74, 1979–80, 1981–82, 1982–83, 1983–84, 1984–85, 1986–87, 1987–88, 1989–90, 1990–91, 1993–94
All Japan Championship:
Winners (37): 1932, 1935, 1947, 1950, 1951, 1952, 1954, 1955, 1956, 1957, 1958, 1964, 1966, 1968, 1969, 1973, 1976, 1977, 1980, 1981, 1983, 1984, 1985, 1986, 1987, 1989, 1992, 1993, 1994, 1995, 1996, 2000, 2002, 2005, 2012, 2016, 2018
Japan Cup:
Winners (2): 2020–21, 2021–22

Year-by-year record
Complete records for previous seasons:

*Prior to the 2008–09 season, there were no shoot-outs and games ended in a tie

Past import players
 Vyacheslav Starshinov 1975–78, F
 Vladimir Shadrin 1979–1983, C
 Yuri Lyapkin 1979–1982, D
 Valery Belousov 1982–1984, F
 Irek Gimayev 1987–1991, D
 Anatoli Fedotov 1995-96/1998-00, D (Former Jets/Mighty Ducks)
 Vladimir Kramskoy 1995-00, D
 Igor Dorofeyev 1998-00, F
 Michael Yoshino 1997–99, F
 Sergei Pryakhin 1998–99, RW (Former Flames)
 Matt Oikawa 1999-00, RW
 Sergei Bautin 2000–02, D (Former Jets/Red Wings/Sharks)
 Aaron Keller 2002–, F
 Burt Henderson 2003–07, D
 Dusty Imoo 2003–06, G
 Greg Parks 2003–04, RW (Former Islanders)
 Dan Daikawa 2004–05, D
 Tavis Hansen 2004–05, RW (Former Jets/Coyotes)
 Jason Podollan 2005–06, RW (Former Panthers/Maple Leafs/Kings/Islanders)
 Jarrod Skalde 2006–07, C (Former Devils/Mighty Ducks/Flames/Sharks/Stars/Blackhawks/Thrashers/Flyers)
 Shane Endicott 2007–09, C (Former Penguins)
 Ricard Persson 2007–09, D (Former Devils/Blues/Senators)

References

External links
Official website 

Asia League Ice Hockey teams
Ice hockey clubs established in 1925
Sports teams in Hokkaido
Ice hockey teams in Japan
1925 establishments in Japan
Tomakomai, Hokkaido